The nephrostome is the funnel-like component of a metanephridium. It is always oriented towards the coelom. The nephrostome is covered from the inside with cilia, which push the water, metabolic wastes, unnecessary hormones and other substances into the metanephridium.

References

Annelid anatomy